Seelow-Gusow station is a railway station in the municipality of Gusow-Platkow in the Märkisch-Oderland district of Brandenburg, Germany. It serves the village of Gusow, as well as the town of Seelow about four kilometers away. It is a stop on the line .

References

Railway stations in Brandenburg
Railway stations in Germany opened in 1866
1866 establishments in Prussia
Buildings and structures in Märkisch-Oderland